Sandsborgskyrkogården is a cemetery in Gamla Enskede in Stockholm, Sweden, established in 1895. Sandsborgskyrkogården is located immediately to the north of Skogskyrkogården, a UNESCO World Heritage Site cemetery.

Notable burials
 Lars-Erik Berenett (1942–2017), actor, screenwriter, singer
 Ture Hedman (1895–1950), Olympic Gold Medal gymnast
 Quorthon (1966–2004), musician

References

External links
 
 

Cemeteries in Sweden